The Foden NC was an unsuccessful design of double-decker bus chassis built by Foden of Sandbach and Northern Counties of Wigan in England between 1976 and 1978.

Background
Foden was primarily a truck manufacturer, although it had also built bus chassis in the past, whilst Northern Counties was a bus body manufacturer, building bodywork onto chassis produced by other companies. At the time of the design's conception, British Leyland had by far the largest share of the market for double-decker buses in the United Kingdom, with its Atlantean, Fleetline and Bristol VR models. The Foden NC was intended to compete against these for a share of this market.

Design
The Foden-NC was a semi-integral design, meaning that it has an underframe (chassis), but that the bodywork is also structurally load-bearing.

The transmission proved to be a weakness, with the Foden transfer box being prone to failures and the Allison gearbox inefficient. Derby City Transport refitted its Foden NC with Voith transmission in an attempt to overcome the problems.

In appearance, the Northern Counties bodywork was very similar to the style built on other chassis.

Production
Only seven vehicles were completed, one of which carried bodywork built by East Lancs instead of Northern Counties. An eighth, partially completed, bus was used for testing.

Greater Manchester PTE purchased two, while West Yorkshire Passenger Transport Executive, West Midlands Passenger Transport Executive, South Yorkshire Passenger Transport Executive, Derby City Transport and Potteries Motor Traction each purchased one.

Most of the vehicles experienced shorter than average working lives, although two still exist, preserved in the care of Aintree Coachlines of Liverpool.

References

Booth, Gavin and Brown, Stewart J. (1984) The Bus Book : Ian Allan Publishing,

External links

Flick gallery

Buses of the United Kingdom
Double-decker buses
Step-entrance buses
Vehicles introduced in 1976